Sauzer's Kiddieland was an amusement park that operated near the U.S. Route 30 and U.S. Route 41 intersection in Schererville, Indiana from 1949 to 1993.  The  park was opened and operated by Frank Sauzer and later operated by his son Frank Sauzer Jr., included about 18 rides and a paddle boat pond.

The Swingin' Gyms were saved by a family in Dyer Indiana and eventually found their way to the Coaster Universe Preservation Museum in Ohio.

Rides
•	Swan Ride

•	Allan Herschell Boat Ride

•	Allan Herschell Kiddie Wheel

•	Allan Herschell Car Ride

•	Allan Herschell Sky Fighter

•	Mangels Roto Whip

•	Allan Herschell Little Dipper Coaster

•	Allan Herschell Mad Mouse Coaster

•	S.D.C Galaxi Coaster

•	Merry-Go-Round

•	Allan Herschell Helicopter Ride

•	Bumper Cars

•	Tilt-a-Whirl

•	Pony rides

•	Miniature train

•	Paddle Boats

•	Eyerly Spider

•	Round Up

•	Watkins Paratrooper

•	Ferris Wheel

•	Eli Bridge Scrambler

•	Hand Carts

•       Swingin' Gyms

Restaurant
 Sauzer's Waffle House (1941–1990)

External links

References

 
 
 

Defunct amusement parks in the United States